Sithivinayagar Vidyalayam ( Cittivināyakar Vittiyālayam) is a provincial school in Point Pedro, Sri Lanka.

See also
 List of schools in Northern Province, Sri Lanka

References

Provincial schools in Sri Lanka
Schools in Point Pedro